Rahimullah may refer to:

People
Shahid Rahimullah (died 1861), Bengali revolutionary
Rahimullah Choudhury, East Pakistani politician
Rahimullah Yusufzai (1954-2021), Pakistani journalist
Rahim Ullah (born 1958), Bangladeshi politician
Rahimullah Sahak (born 1999), Afghan cricketer

See also
Rahimahullah, Arabic phrase
Rahimtulla M. Sayani, Indian politician
Rahimtulla Tower, building in Kenya